Legal coding is the process of creating summary or keyword data from a document. It is widely used in the legal profession to create a fast-search index or database of documents for use in litigation.

Objective Coding Definitions
 The recording of basic data such as date, author, or document type, from documents into a database.
 Extracting information from electronic documents such as date created, author recipient, CC and linking each image to the information in pre-defined objective fields. In direct opposition to Subjective Coding where legal interpretations of data in a document are linked to individual documents. Also called bibliographic coding.
 Extracting such information from a document as its author, its mailing date, etc. Objective coding is usually done from the document text or image, because the metadata may be inaccurate. For example, a document written and signed by a partner might show the administrative assistant as the author in the metadata, because it was originally typed on the assistant's computer.

Subjective coding
Subjective coding is the indexing of documents according to subjective data. This may be gleaned from templates, or more usually from a subjective reading by someone familiar with the topic. This is the more reliable way to determine factors such as 'importance' of the document.

Legal citation
Document management systems